Choi Hyo-bin, better known as ChoiHyoBin, is a South Korean former professional Overwatch player. He began his career playing with team X6-Gaming, where he won the first Overwatch Contenders Korea championship. Choi signed with the San Francisco Shock for the inaugural season of the Overwatch League (OWL). He won two OWL championships with the Shock, in 2019 and 2020, and was named the 2019 Grand Finals most valuable player.

Professional career

X6-Gaming 
Choi began his Overwatch career with Korean team X6-Gaming in 2017, where he competed in multiple seasons of the OGN APEX series, a premier Overwatch tournament series in South Korea. Choi was part of X6-Gaming's APEX Challengers Season 3 Championship team, were he mainly played as the tank character D.Va. After the inception of the Overwatch League (OWL), the APEX series ended, and X6-Gaming began competition in the newly formed Overwatch Contenders (OWC) series. Choi took home the first-ever OWC Korea title in 2018 after X6-Gaming swept O2 Ardeont, 4–0, in the finals.

San Francisco Shock 
On April 5, 2018, Choi was picked up by the San Francisco Shock of the Overwatch League. Signed in the middle of the 2018 season, he made his OWL debut on May 24, 2018, in a 2–3 loss to the London Spitfire.

In the 2019 season, Choi started as one of the team's tank players, mainly playing as D.Va. The team went on to win the Stage 2 Playoffs after a win over the Vancouver Titans. Throughout the regular season, Choi had the sixth-least average deaths per minute among all tank players. Throughout the 2019 postseason, Choi mainly played as Sigma. The team fell to the Atlanta Reign in the first match of the playoffs, dropping them to the lower bracket of the tournament; after four consecutive wins in the lower bracket, the Shock made it to the 2019 Overwatch League Grand Finals, where they faced the Vancouver Titans. Up to that point in the postseason, Choi had the second-most eliminations among all players, averaging 22.96 elimination per 10 minutes. In the Grand Finals match, the Shock swept the Titans, 4–0, and Choi was named the 2019 Grand Finals Most Valuable Player.

In the 2020 season, Choi alternated between playing D.Va and Sigma, due to the league introducing hero pools, a weekly system where characters are banned from play; Choi won two midseason tournaments with the Shock – the May Melee and the Countdown Cup. Choi was nominated for the league's regular season most valuable player award and selected to play in the 2020 All-Star Game. Additionally, Choi was awarded a 2020 Role-Star commendation, marking the first time that a player has earned two such awards two years in a row. Choi won his second OWL Grand Finals after the Shock defeated the Seoul Dynasty in the 2020 Overwatch League Grand Finals.

Following the 2021 season, Choi retired from competitive Overwatch.

References

External links
Career statistics and player information from the Overwatch League.

South Korean esports players
Living people
San Francisco Shock players
Year of birth missing (living people)